Phalotris is a genus of snakes of the subfamily Dipsadinae.

Geographic range
All species of the genus Phalotris are found in South America.

Species
The following 19 species are recognized as being valid.
 Phalotris bilineatus (Duméril, Bibron, G. & Duméril, 1854)
 Phalotris concolor Ferrarezzi, 1993
 Phalotris cuyanus (Cei, 1984)
 Phalotris illustrator Scrocchi, Giraudo, & Nenda, 2022
 Phalotris labiomaculatus de Lema, 2002
 Phalotris lativittatus Ferrarezzi, 1993
 Phalotris lemniscatus (A.M.C. Duméril, Bibron & A.H.A. Duméril, 1854)
 Phalotris matogrossensis de Lema, D'Agostini & Cappellari, 2005
 Phalotris mertensi (Hoge, 1955)
 Phalotris multipunctatus Puorto & Ferrarezzi, 1993
 Phalotris nasutus (Gomes, 1915)
 Phalotris nigrilatus Ferrarezzi, 1993
 Phalotris normanscotti Cabral & Cacciali, 2015
 Phalotris reticulatus (W. Peters, 1860)
 Phalotris sansebastiani Jansen & G. Köhler, 2008
 Phalotris shawnella Smith, Brouard & Cacciali, 2022
 Phalotris spegazzinii (Boulenger, 1913)
 Phalotris suspectus (Amaral, 1924)
 Phalotris tricolor (A.M.C. Duméril, Bibron & A.H.A. Duméril, 1854)Nota bene: A binomial authority in parentheses indicates that the species was originally described in a genus other than Phalotris.

Etymology
The specific name, mertensi, is in honor of German herpetologist Robert Mertens.

The specific name, normanscotti, is in honor of Norman Scott, Jr., in recognition of his contribution to the knowledge of the herpetofauna of Paraguay.

 Venom 
The venom of this genus was poorly characterized, due to the low amount produced by Colubridae, a more detailed characterization of particularly interesting proteins could only be viable by obtaining recombinant proteins, but there is a report of an accident by a Phalotris, which resulted in headache, local and oral mucosa hemorrhage, edema and renal failure. Another accident report occurred with a 37-year-old biologist, whose symptoms were immediate local pain, bleeding and edema, a few hours later there was headache, systemic hemorrhage, fever, myalgia and dark urine. A study of the venom of Phalotris mertensi showed a myotoxic action 3 times greater than Bothrops jararaca.

References

Further reading
Cope ED (1862). "Observations upon certain Cyprinoid fish in Pennsylvania; on Elapomorphus, Sympholis, and Coniophanes ". Proc. Acad. Nat. Sci. Philadelphia 13: 522–524. (Phalotris, new genus, p. 524).
Cacciali, P., Mee, G., Plettenberg Laing, A., Krause, D., Mclaughlin, C., Montgomery, R. and Smith, P. (2020). "Morphological Re-Examination of the Endemic Paraguayan Snake Phalotris nigrilatus Ferrarezzi, 1993 (Serpentes: Colubridae: Elapomorphini), with Notes on Its Ecology and Conservation Status." Current Herpetology'', 39(1), 28–37. www.herpco.com

Dipsadinae
Snake genera